Snowflake, the White Gorilla is a 2011 Spanish live action/computer-animated adventure film directed by Andrés G. Schaer. The film depicts the fictional childhood of the white gorilla Snowflake.

An English dub with an unknown cast was released. It was produced by Grindstone Entertainment Group and distributed by Lionsgate Home Entertainment. The original Spanish version of the film portrays Snowflake as a male gorilla, while the English dub makes the character a female gorilla.

Synopsis
In 1966, Snowflake is the only white gorilla in the world, and the main attraction at the zoo. Children love him/her, but he/she's different from other gorillas. With the help of Ailur, an eccentric red panda, Snowflake plans a secret mission to sneak out of the zoo, venturing into the dangerous city in order to find a witch to help her become a "normal" gorilla. Will Snowflake find the cure he/she's looking for, or realize that there's something more important than fitting in?

Cast

Spanish cast
 Kai Stroink as Snowflake
 Manel Fuentes as Ailur
 Claudia Abate as Wendy
 Constantino Romero as Anvil
 Pere Ponce as Dr. Archibald Pepper
 Elsa Pataky as Bruhmilda the Witch

English dub cast 

 Benjamin Nathan-Serio as Ailur

American English dub cast
 Ariana Grande as Snowflake
 David Spade as Ailur
 Jennette McCurdy as Petunia
 Nathan Kress as Elvis
 Dallas Lovato as Wendy
 Eva Bella as Young Wendy
 Keith David as Anvil
 Christopher Lloyd as Dr. Archibald Pepper
 Diane Michelle as Bruhmilda the Witch

Music
The original score of Snowflake is composed by Zacarías M. and De la Riva. The American version features two songs, "One In A Million Girl" and "Avalanche" performed by Dallas Lovato and composed by Stephane Deriau-Reine (Stephan DeReine) and Mychal Simka.

Analysis
University of Chicago professor Elizabeth Tavella writes in an article on media representations of the original gorilla that the film presents an "overt representation of racialized tropes" including "problematic representations of reverse discrimination". One such trope is the "notion of Blackness arising from dirt", expressed when Snowflake tries to darken his fur with mud to be accepted as a "Black" gorilla by other gorillas at the zoo. Tavella further notes that in the English dubbing, "directorial choices have a drastic impact on gender and racial dynamics", with Snowflake being portrayed as a female gorilla and voiced by a White female actress, and the primary protagonist gorilla being voiced by a black male, which "reinforces the correlation between sexism and racism".

More succinctly, The Guardian featured the poster for the film in a sardonic gallery about the Cannes Film Festival Marché du Film, stating that there was "something just slightly uncomfortable about this one".

The film received a generally positive review from Cinefilos in Italy, for which the reviewer described it as "an adventure on the road through the streets of a very sunny Barcelona of the 60s mixed with the search for oneself", and found the story to be "linear and simple like the wishes of the little gorilla cub". The review did note that the primary human antagonist of the film was "a too-soft version of Disney's Cruella de Vil". Spanish reviewer Videodromo describes the movie as entertaining for children, though stating that "the overall quality of the product is not exceptional", with the integration of animated characters into a live-action environment falling short of expectations. The review further suggests that children should only see it once, when they are young, because revisiting it at a later age will make them more likely to notice "poorly polished special effects or those laughable dialogues".

References

External links
 Snowflake, the White Gorilla at Internet Movie Database
 

2011 films
2011 computer-animated films
2011 direct-to-video films
2010s adventure films
Spanish animated films
Lionsgate films
Direct-to-video animated films
Animated films about gorillas
Films with live action and animation
Films scored by Zacarías M. de la Riva